The following lists events that happened during 1979 in South Africa.

Incumbents
 State President:
 John Vorster (until 4 June).
 Marais Viljoen (acting from 4 June, elected from 19 June).
 Prime Minister: P.W. Botha.
 Chief Justice: Frans Lourens Herman Rumpff.

Events

January
 8 – South Africa and Lesotho sign a monetary agreement.
 14 – Police clash with Umkhonto we Sizwe guerrillas near Zeerust and arrest one while six escape into Botswana.
 23 – A bomb explodes near the New Canada railway station in Soweto.
 24 – A large amount of explosives is found and defused on the railway line between Fort Beaufort and King William's Town.

February
 Sergeant Benjamin Letlako, a Police Special Branch member, is shot dead in Katlehong.

April
 Explosives are discovered and defused on a railway line near Soweto.

May
 5 – Guerrillas open fire in the Moroka Police Station, killing one and wounding three more policemen and three civilians.
 29 – Bishop Abel Muzorewa becomes the transitional Prime Minister of Zimbabwe-Rhodesia.

June
 4 – Following the Information Scandal, John Vorster resigns as State President of South Africa.
 4 – Marais Viljoen becomes acting State President of South Africa for the second time.
 19 – Marais Viljoen becomes State President of South Africa.
 Explosives are discovered and defused on a railway line in the Eastern Transvaal.

September
 22 – A Vela satellite detects a flash in the southern Atlantic Ocean, believed to be a South African-Israeli nuclear test.

November
 Guerrillas open fire and hurl grenades in the Orlando Police Station charge office, killing two policemen and wounding two.
 Grenades are thrown into the home of Special Branch policeman Lt Magezi Ngobeni and five children are wounded.

December
 A bomb explodes and damages the railway line near Alice.
 A bomb explodes at the Sasol Oil Refineries and cause massive structural damage.

Unknown date
 The National Council of Lawyers for Human Rights is established.
 The African National Congress's Special Operations, reporting directly to Oliver Tambo, is established.
 The African National Congress' Nova Catengue Training Camp is attacked and destroyed by the South African Air Force.

Births
 8 January – Butch James, rugby player
 10 January – Louise Carver, singer-songwriter, pianist
 29 January – Mfuneko Ngam, cricketer
 5 February – Steve Lekoelea, soccer player
 14 February – Wesley Moodie, tennis player
 23 February – Jaco van Zyl, golfer
 25 February – Wikus van Heerden, rugby player
 18 March – Bonnie Mbuli, actress
 25 March – Kgomotso Christopher, actress and voice over artist best known for her time in Isidingo as Katlego Sibeko
 6 April – Manaka Ranaka, actress
 9 April – Ryan Cox, professional road racing cyclist. (d. 2007)
 3 June – Deon Carstens, rugby player
 23 June – Marilyn Agliotti, field hockey player
 6 July – Zandile Msutwana, actress
 10 July – Marius Joubert, rugby player
 4 August – Robin Peterson, cricketer
 12 September – Gcobani Bobo, rugby player
 17 September – Neill Blomkamp, film director, producer, screenwriter, and animator.
 22 September – Bakkies Botha, rugby player
 9 October – Hendrik Odendaal, swimmer
 11 October – Zonke, singer
 21 November – Jason Hartman, singer-songwriter
 16 December – Trevor Immelman, golfer
 24 December – DJ Cleo, recording artist, DJ and record producer
 28 December – Elvis Blue, singer, musician

Deaths
 6 April – Solomon Mahlangu, Umkhonto we Sizwe operative hanged (b. 1956)
 12 June – David Sibeko, Pan Africanist Congress representative to the United Nations. (b. 1938)
 8 August – Lionel Cooper, mathematician. (b. 1915)
 10 November – Harry Hart, athlete. (b. 1905)

Railways

Locomotives
 The South African Railways places the first of 105 Class 6E1, Series 8 electric locomotives in mainline service.

Sports

Motorsport
 3 March – The South African Grand Prix takes place at Kyalami.
 Jody Scheckter becomes Formula One World Champion.

References

South Africa
Years in South Africa
History of South Africa